Harald of Norway may refer to:
Harald I of Norway (c. 848 – c. 931), also known as Harald Fairhair.
Harald II of Norway (died 969), also known as Harald Greycloak.
Harald III of Norway (1015 – September 25, 1066 in Stamford bridge, England), also known as Harald Hardråde.
Harald IV of Norway (died 1136), also known as Harald Gille.
Harald V of Norway (born February 21, 1937), present King of Norway.